Archibald Henry Simpson (1 October 1843 – 2 October 1918) was a judge of the Supreme Court of New South Wales. He served as Chief Judge in Equity for over 20 years.

History
Simpson was born at Clapham, England and was educated at Tunbridge School, Kent.
He entered Christ College, Cambridge, studying Law, graduated BA, MA, and was admitted to the Bar in 1868. He emigrated to Australia in 1881 and devoted himself to Equity and Bankruptcy work. In 1885 he was admitted ad eundem AM by Sydney University and appointed QC in 1886 and elevated to the Bench as Probate and Bankruptcy judge.
In 1898 he succeeded Justice Manning as Chief Judge in Equity. He notably disliked sitting for hours at a stretch, so had a sort of well constructed so that while hearing disputes he could stand, though the fact would not be obvious to the litigants.

He died at his home, "St Ives", Hunter's Hill at age 75, following a paralytic stroke.
His remains were buried at the Field of Mars Cemetery, Ryde, New South Wales.

Other interests
Simpson was elected to the University of Sydney senate in 1897 and in 1903 was appointed Vice-Chancellor.

Publications 
A Treatise on the Law and Practice Relating to Infants (1890) Stevens and Haynes, 603 pages

Family
Simpson married Alice Marion Goldie (died 1 July 1928) in January 1885. A beneficiary of her will was St Alban's College, Hunters Hill, for an "A. H. Simpson Scholarship" to benefit boys wanting to enter the Anglican ministry.

Their family included three sons and a daughter:
George Barre Goldie Simpson (7 January 1887 – 1915) was killed on the Western Front.
Adam James Goldie Simpson (9 March 1888 – 14 August 1957) married Marjorie M. Blaxland on 20 December 1916.
Hilda Marion "Ellen" Simpson (26 March 1890 – 21 August 1954) unmarried
Claude Herbert Goldie Simpson (3 May 1893 – 19 April 1960)

See also
List of judges of the Supreme Court of New South Wales

References 

1843 births
1918 deaths
Judges of the Supreme Court of New South Wales
Vice-Chancellors of the University of Sydney